The siege of Bidar, was a twenty-seven day siege mounted by the Mughal Empire against the Adil Shahi dynasty's garrison at Bidar, then controlled by Mohammed Adil Shah, Sultan of Bijapur. The garrison was commanded by Sidi Marjan, who eventually surrendered and then died of his wounds.

Battle
Aurangzeb and his army advanced towards Bijapur and besieged Bidar. The Kiladar (governor or captain) of the fortress, Sidi Marjan, defended it with 1,000 cavalry and 4,000 infantry. Sidi Marjan was mortally wounded when a gunpowder magazine exploded. After twenty-seven days of hard fighting Bidar was captured by the Mughals.

Aftermath
The wealthy city of Bidar became part of the Mughal Empire.

Notes and references

Notes

References
 

Bidar
Adil Shahi dynasty
Bidar
1657 in India